People's Free Library of South Carolina is a historic library building located at Lowrys, Chester County, South Carolina, United States. It was built in 1903–04, and is a small, one-story, rectangular building with a single room. The building has a gable roof, weatherboard siding, and stone foundation piers. It features a wooden wraparound porch. The building was restored in 1976, and serves as a museum and community landmark. The library operated a traveling library service from 1904 until at least 1909, perhaps the first such service in the state.

It was listed on the National Register of Historic Places in 1982.

References

Libraries on the National Register of Historic Places in South Carolina
Library buildings completed in 1904
Buildings and structures in Chester County, South Carolina
National Register of Historic Places in Chester County, South Carolina